Observation Peak may refer to:

 Observation Peak (Alberta), Banff National Park, Alberta, Canada
Observation Peak (California), a mountain in California, United States
Observation Peak (Wyoming) a mountain in Yellowstone National Park, Wyoming, United States